Balcombe railway station is on the Brighton Main Line in England, serving the village of Balcombe, West Sussex. It is managed by Southern.

Trains calling at Balcombe are operated by Thameslink.

History

The original station was opened in July 1841 by the London and Brighton Railway, which became the London Brighton and South Coast Railway in 1846. The station was resited to its present position in 1848 or 1849.

The station became part of the Southern Railway during the grouping of 1923. The station then passed on to the Southern Region of British Railways on nationalisation in 1948. When sectorisation was introduced in the 1980s, the station was served by Network SouthEast until the privatisation of British Railways.

Services
All services at Balcombe are operated by Thameslink using  EMUs.
 
The typical off-peak service in trains per hour is:
 2 tph to  via 
 2 tph to 

On Sundays, the service is reduced to hourly in each direction and northbound services run to  instead of Bedford.

References

 
 
 
 Station on navigable O.S. map

External links 

Mid Sussex District
Railway stations in West Sussex
DfT Category E stations
Former London, Brighton and South Coast Railway stations
Railway stations in Great Britain opened in 1841
Railway stations served by Govia Thameslink Railway